Ashwell railway station was a station in Ashwell, Rutland on the line between Melton Mowbray and Oakham. It lies west of the village, on the road to Whissendine. Just north of Ashwell was Ashwell Junction where the Cottesmore Ironstone Branch joined. This was in use between 1883 and 1974 and served quarries in the vicinity of Cottesmore and Exton. Part of the former mineral branch line is now Rutland Railway Museum (trading as Rocks by Rail: The Living Ironstone Museum).

History
Opened by the Midland Railway as the Syston and Peterborough Railway, it became part of the London, Midland and Scottish Railway during the Grouping of 1923. The station then passed on to the London Midland Region of British Railways on nationalisation in 1948.

In 1966 it was closed by the British Railways Board.

The site today
Trains still pass the former station between Melton Mowbray and Oakham stations on the Birmingham to Peterborough Line.

The site now houses some industrial units, called Station Court.

References
 
 
 Ashwell station on navigable O. S. map

Former Midland Railway stations
Disused railway stations in Rutland
Railway stations in Great Britain opened in 1848
Railway stations in Great Britain closed in 1966
Beeching closures in England